Swing Latino is a salsa dance school academy in Cali, Colombia, founded in the late 1990s by its current director, dancer and choreographer, Luis Eduardo Hernandez (also known as "El Mulato").

They are known for their appearance in the Fox TV show ¡Q'Viva! The Chosen.

Swing Latino has won multiple salsa dance contests in their home country Colombia and in the United States including the 2004 World Congress "Salsa Open" in Philadelphia, the 2005 World Salsa Dancing Federation's Championship, in Miami and the 2006 and 2007 Las Vegas Salsa Championship, which aired in ESPN.

Swing Latino has also performed abroad in Puerto Rico and toured throughout the United Kingdom.

Television
In 2009, Swing Latino was a guest performer in the Polish television show You Can Dance: Po prostu tańcz! and the following day made another appearance on that same country's morning show Dzień Dobry TVN. Swing Latino also appeared on the Colombian telenovela Un Sueño Llamado Salsa which aired in the United States on the Spanish language network Telefutura in 2010.
In 2012, after a visit from fellow salsa singer Marc Anthony, Swing Latino was featured as one of many Latin artists appearing in the television show ¡Q'Viva! The Chosen, airing in both Fox and Univision networks.

Swing Latino appeared and competed on the first season of the 2017 reality program World of Dance. They were the winners of the team division and competed in the finale against Les Twins and Eva Igo.

Current members
 Nilson Emir Castro Riascos
 Deisy Alejandra Roldan Zapata
 Kevin Alberto Alzate Mosquera
 Steven´s Rebolledo Montaño (MAIN DANCER)
 Yinessa Ortega Ulcue (MAIN DANCER)
 Angie Osorio (MAIN DANCER)
 Leidy Giraldo (MAIN DANCER)
 Ingrid Vanesa Tabaez
 Lina Marcela Montoya
 Jhon Andres Lucual Colorado
 Cristian David Montenegro
 Jhon Jairo Cabezas Caicedo
 Paula Tatiana Guevara
 Jeimmy Fabian larguelia
 Yohana Molina Calambas
 Jonier Francisco Torres
 Luz Adriana Posso
 Jenny Lorena Rodríguez
 Carlos Fernando Marquez
 Andres Felipe Diez
 Saray Gonzales Duque
 Johan Moreno
 Eliana Katherine Feijoo Saavedra
 Emanuelle Antonio Campaz

References

External links
Swing Latino's website
¡Q'Viva! The Chosen official website

Dance schools
Dance in Colombia